Marcin Nowak is the name of:

 Marcin Nowak (musician) (called "Novy"; born 1975), Polish death metal musician
 Marcin Nowak (volleyball) (born 1975), Polish volleyballer
 Marcin Nowak (sprinter) (born 1977), Polish sprinter
 Marcin Nowak (footballer) (born 1979), Polish footballer 
 Marcin Nowak (director), Polish director and special effects artist
 Marcin Nowak (speedway rider) (born 1995), Polish Speedway rider